Trnovska Vas is a settlement in the Municipality of Trnovska Vas in northeastern Slovenia. It is the seat of the municipality. The area is part of the traditional region of Styria. It is now included in the Drava Statistical Region. The settlement lies on the regional road from Ptuj to Lenart v Slovenskih Goricah in the Pesnica Valley.

The local parish church is dedicated to Saint Wolfgang and belongs to the Roman Catholic Archdiocese of Maribor. It dates to the 18th century.

References

External links
 Trnovska Vas at Geopedia

Populated places in the Municipality of Trnovska vas